This is a list of American football players who have played for the Brooklyn Horsemen in the National Football League in 1926.  It includes players that have played at least one match during the NFL season.  The Lions franchise was originally merged with the Brooklyn Horsemen of the American Football League until disbanding after the 1926 NFL season.
 

H Was on Brooklyn Horsemen AFL team roster prior to merger with the NFL Lions

1 Also played tailback
2 Also played center
3 Position later known as quarterback
4 Started season with Hartford Blues
5 Finished season with Frankford Yellow Jackets
6 Finished season with New York Yankees (AFL)
7 Also played end
8 Also played tackle
9 Played wingback and blocking back
10 Also played wingback
11 Started season with New York Giants
12 Also played guard

References
1926 Brooklyn Lions Roster

 
Brooklyn Lions